Szentlőrinc is a town in Baranya county, Hungary.

Sport
The association football club Szentlőrinc SE, currently competing in the Nemzeti Bajnokság II, are based in the town.

Twin towns
Szentlőrinc is twinned with:
  Urbach, Germany

External links

  in Hungarian

Populated places in Baranya County